Azerbaijani nationalism, also referred to as Azerbaijanism, started out as a cultural movement among Azerbaijani intellectuals within the Russian Empire during the second half of the 19th century. While initially cultural in nature, it was later developed further into a political ideology which culminated in the establishment of the Azerbaijan Democratic Republic in 1918.

Identity formation
Compared to Armenian and Georgian nationalism, a specifically ethnic nationalism was rather slow to develop among Azerbaijanis, partly due to their self-identification as part of the larger Muslim world rather than as a singular ethnocultural nation. Soviet historian Sheila Fitzpatrick remarked that, "Of the Caucasus republics, Azerbaijan is the most egregious example of the Soviet invention of tradition with regard to nationality, and Azerbaijanis were particularly ruthless in dealing with the republic’s lesser, non-titular nationalities. This was despite, or perhaps because of, the exceptional fuzziness of their own national identity claims. ‘Azerbaijani’ became the preferred term for a particular set of Turkic people of Islamic faith in the region only in the mid 1930s: previous variants had included ‘Tiurks’ (as distinct from ‘Turks’), ‘Azerbaijani Tiurks’, ‘Muslims’, ‘Azerbaijani Tatars’, ‘Caucasian Tatars’ and ‘Azeris’. "

Following the Nagorno-Karabakh conflict and its declaration of independence in 1991, Azerbaijan has witnessed the ascent of a particularly strong Azerbaijani nationalism, including various types of Pan-nationalism and irredentism.

Territory
Irredentist claims by Azerbaijani nationalists would mainly seek to incorporate large sections of Iran as well as parts of Armenia, Russia, Georgia and Turkey within a proposed enlarged territory known as Whole Azerbaijan or "Augmented Azerbaijan." Iran hosts a larger number of ethnic Azerbaijanis than the Republic of Azerbaijan, and prior to the establishment of the Azerbaijan Democratic Republic in 1918, the name of "Azerbaijan" was exclusively used to identify the adjacent region of contemporary northwestern Iran.

Laurence Broers, the Caucasus program director at Conciliation Resources explains replication of dynamics previously characterizing the line of contact around Nagorno-Karabakh along the internationally recognized Armenian-Azerbaijani borders in the political context of Azerbaijan's effort to enforce peace on its terms after its victory in the 2020 Nagorno-Karabakh War, imposing a set of territorial claims articulated with increasing intensity since May 2021. He sees the deployment of Azerbaijani troops to pockets of Armenia's territory along the border between the two states as "borderization": the transformation of a line of actual control into an international border, or a future concession in a coercive bargaining game. Another set of claims concerns Soviet-era exclaves – three Azerbaijani exclaves in Armenia and an Armenian one in Azerbaijan – which were de facto incorporated into the surrounding state during conflict in the 1990s.

The largest claim however, is the revival of a historical territorial designation for the region of Zangezur as a lost Azerbaijani ethno-space, deriving the concept from the name of a Zangezur uyezd (the right of transit across southern Armenia outlined in 2020 Nagorno-Karabakh ceasefire agreement is widely referred to in Azerbaijan as the "Zangezur corridor", which Azerbaijani President Ilham Aliyev has threatened to take by force if not willingly given. On July 7, 2021, Azerbaijan reorganized its internal economic regions creating a new region bordering Syunik called "Eastern Zangezur", implying that there is a "Western Zangezur" – that is, Syunik).

Beginning in the early twentieth century, Azerbaijani nationalist ideologues have also made common cause with ethnically affiliated populations through Pan-Turkism.

Nagorno-Karabakh Conflict 
Azerbaijan's defeat in the First Nagorno-Karabakh War (1992-1994) gave birth to what historian Ronald Grigor Suny has described as a "reactive nationalism": "something that was generated and shaped in that conflict" among a population for whom, amidst the Soviet collapse, civil society was virtually non-existent, national sense of self weak, and where a "rabid and quite harsh nationalism directed specifically against Armenians and created by anti-Armenian hostility developed."

Azerbaijani Historiography and the Karabakh Conflict

During the Soviet era, a number of Azerbaijani scholars sought to construct a pseudohistorical national past by examining the small kingdoms and principalities that were founded on the territory of the modern republic of Azerbaijan during the medieval period. Based on a dubious rereading and interpretation of primary sources, Ziya Bunyadov and Farida Mammadova both argued in their first publications in the 1950s and 1960s that the leaders and inhabitants of Caucasian Albania, a state established in the 2nd century BC, were the direct ancestors of modern Azeris, thereby establishing a link to the ancient past and the Azerbaijanis' indigeneity to Nagorno-Karabakh. In the process, the Armenians who inhabited the South Caucasus were written out of the narrative altogether, with Azerbaijani historians ascribing an Albanian origin to nearly all of the Armenian artifacts, monasteries, churches, and other monuments in Nagorno-Karabakh and the neighboring region of Nakhichevan, with the state going so far as outright destroying Armenian cultural heritage in Julfa and elsewhere. Many medieval-era Armenian written sources, and even traveler accounts by foreigners who visited Karabakh, that have been published in Azerbaijan deliberately omit the names "Armenia" and "Armenians" or replace them with Albania and Albanians, respectively. In the years following the Soviet collapse and the end of the first war in 1994, Azerbaijan adopted and amplified the Albanian thesis and continues to propagate it in state-sponsored books, pamphlets, and other forms of media.

Ohannes Geukjian has written that, for Azerbaijani historians, "the ethnic past was important to legitimate their present claims to Karabakh. Without a well-established ethnic past, it would be difficult to mobilize the community for political purposes."

See also 
 Whole Azerbaijan
 Pan-Turkism
 Shusha pogrom
 Khojaly Massacre
 Turkish nationalism
 Armenian nationalism

References

External links
 "'Врагу - ненависть, ненависть, ненависть.' Чем 'культ победы' оборачивается для азербайджанских школьников," BBC Russian, 26 December 2022.

Further reading
 Boers, Laurence. Armenia and Azerbaijan: Anatomy of a Rivalry. Edinburgh: Edinburgh University Press, 2019.
 Goff, Krista A. Nested Nationalism: Making and Unmaking Nations in the Soviet Caucasus. Ithaca: Cornell University Press, 2021. 
 Suny, Ronald Grigor. The Revenge of the Past: Nationalism, Revolution, and the Collapse of the Soviet Union. Stanford: Stanford University Press, 1993.
 Swietochowski, Tadeusz. Russian Azerbaijan, 1905-1920: The Shaping of a National Identity in a Muslim Community. Cambridge: Cambridge University Press, 1985. 
 ___. Russia and Azerbaijan: A Borderland in Transition. New York: Columbia University Press, 1995.

 
Nationalism
Nationalism
Politics of Azerbaijan
Foreign relations of Azerbaijan